Farm Cove can mean one of at least three places:

Farm Cove, New South Wales, in Sydney Harbour, Australia
Farm Cove, New Zealand, suburb of Auckland, New Zealand
Farm Cove, bay in Macquarie Harbour, Tasmania, Australia